CHGL-FM is a First Nations community radio station that operates at 94.9 FM in Green Lake, Saskatchewan, Canada.

The station is owned by the Green Lake Radio and Television Broadcasting Society.

External links
CHGL 94.9 FM Facebook
MBC Radio

Hgl
Year of establishment missing